Klaas Ysbrand "Jimmy" Twisk (13 July 1930 – 4 March 1999) was a Dutch racing driver. He competed in two Formula One non-championship races, the 1959 Silver City Trophy and the 1961 London Trophy, driving a Cooper T51. His best start position was 14th place, and his best result was 16th place.

He also drove in Formula Two and Formula Junior. In September 1960 he won a Formula Two race at Rufforth Circuit.

Non-championship Formula One results
(key)

References

1930 births
1999 deaths
Dutch racing drivers
Dutch Formula One drivers